Kelly Bailey (born 19 February 1998) is a British-Portuguese actress and model.

Biography 
Kelly Ribeiro Bailey was born on 19 February 1998. Her father is English and her mother is Portuguese.

Her debut on TV happened in 2015, in TVI's production A Única Mulher. Since then she has starred in A Herdeira and Prisioneira, also from TVI. 

Nowadays, the actress plays Maria Rita Raposo in the telenovela "Bem me Quer", shown on TVI. 

In 2018 she participated in her first film, having the leading role in Portuguese production "Linhas de Sangue".

References

External links
 

1998 births
Living people
Portuguese models
Portuguese film actresses
Portuguese people of English descent